Carlos Muzzio (born 21 August 1984) is an Argentinian rugby union player, currently playing for Rugby Pro D2 side Mont-de-Marsan. His preferred position is prop.

Professional career
Muzzio represented both  and Tarbes before joining  in 2014. At the age of 36, he was named in the Argentina squad for the 2021 Rugby Championship. He made his debut for Argentina in Round 1 of the Rugby Championship against South Africa.

References

External links
itsrugby.co.uk Profile

1984 births
Living people
Argentine rugby union players
Argentina international rugby union players
Tarbes Pyrénées Rugby players
Stade Montois players
Rugby union props